Sainte-Suzanne-sur-Vire (literally Sainte-Suzanne on Vire) is a commune in the Manche department in Normandy in north-western France.

See also
Communes of the Manche department

References

Saintesuzannesurvire
Manche communes articles needing translation from French Wikipedia